Justin David Phillips (born 3 February 1995) is a South African rugby union player for the  in Super Rugby and  in the Currie Cup and in the Rugby Challenge. His regular position is scrum-half.

Rugby career

Schoolboy rugby

In both 2012 and 2013, he was included in a South Africa Schools squad after the Craven Week tournament. In 2012, he started matches against France and England, while in 2013, he started against England and came on as a replacement against Wales.

Western Province

After high school, he moved to Cape Town to join the Western Province Rugby Institute. He started nine matches for the  team during the 2014 Under-19 Provincial Championship, scoring four tries. His first try came in a 21–20 win over  before scoring two tries in a 43–24 victory over the s in Potchefstroom.

He was also in the starting line-up for their semi-final victory over the Golden Lions and their victory in the final over the Free State to win a youth title for the second year in a row.

References

South African rugby union players
Living people
1995 births
Rugby union players from Pretoria
Rugby union scrum-halves
Western Province (rugby union) players
South African people of British descent